"One" is the first single from rapper Fat Joe's album Jealous Ones Still Envy 2 (J.O.S.E. 2).

Background
"One" was released as the first single from Fat Joe's album J.O.S.E. 2. Fat Joe has stated the song was inspired by his marriage.

Charts

References

2009 singles
Akon songs
Fat Joe songs
music videos directed by Chris Robinson (director)
Song recordings produced by the Inkredibles
songs written by Fat Joe
songs written by Kevin Cossom